Francisco Mateos (born 4 April 1947) is a Spanish weightlifter. He competed at the 1972 Summer Olympics and the 1976 Summer Olympics.

References

1947 births
Living people
Spanish male weightlifters
Olympic weightlifters of Spain
Weightlifters at the 1972 Summer Olympics
Weightlifters at the 1976 Summer Olympics
Sportspeople from Seville
20th-century Spanish people